Fausto Batignani (2 July 1903 – 2 November 1975) was a Uruguayan footballer who played as a goalkeeper. He played eleven matches for the Uruguay national team between 1922 and 1928.

Career statistics

International

References

External links

1903 births
1975 deaths
Uruguayan footballers
Uruguay international footballers
Footballers from Montevideo
Association football goalkeepers
Club Nacional de Football players
Liverpool F.C. (Montevideo) players